Chochoyote, chochoyota, chochoyo or chochoyón is a small dumpling made of masa. They are shaped like balls with a characteristic crater, made by depressing a finger in the center. They are typically baked or boiled in broth. They are commonly served with the dish Mole Amarillo from Oaxaca.

Preparation 
Mix and knead one part of water and one part of corn flour to make the corn dough. Salt and lard are added. The lard helps to harden the dough and adds flavor. It is also frequently flavored with some herb, such as epazote, hoja santa, avocado leaf, cilantro, parsley or chipilín. With the hands, form small balls of 2 to 3 cm in diameter, flatten them slightly and with the finger make an indentation so that the dough cooks better. They are added raw to the stew, adding a lot of flavor and thickening it slightly.

References 
 Muñoz Zurita, Ricardo. Small Larousee of Mexican Cuisine. (2013).

External links 
 Photograph of chochoyotes

Mexican cuisine